Roberto Tremelloni (30 October 1900 – 8 September 1987) was an Italian economist, academic, businessman and a social democrat politician. He served in different cabinets of Italy.

Biography
Tremelloni was born in Milan on 30 October 1900. He held a degree in economics and commercial sciences, which he received in Turin in 1926.

Tremelloni was a lecturer of political economy at the University of Geneva. In 1930 he became a professor of economics and business management at the Polytechnic University of Milan. He cofounded the 24 ore which was first published on 15 February 1933. In 1937, he carried out a study on the textile industry of Italy. Between 1947 and 1948 Tremelloni served as the minister of industry and commerce in the fourth cabinet of Prime Minister Alcide De Gasperi. Tremelloni was appointed minister without portfolio responsible for the implementation of the Marshall Plan to the fifth cabinet of De Gasperi in 1948. However, Tremelloni and two other cabinet members, Giuseppe Saragat, deputy prime minister and minister of merchant navy and Ivan Matteo Lombardo, minister of industry and commerce, resigned from office on 31 October 1949. Tremelloni  became the president of the Istituto per le Relazioni Pubbliche, founded in Milan in 1952.

He was the leader of the Italian Socialist Party (PSI) and then of the breakaway Social Democrats (PSDI). He was also a deputy at the Italian parliament. In the 1950s he and Ezio Vigorelli led the parliament's inquiry committee on the problems of poverty and unemployment. He was named as the minister of finance in the coalition cabinet led by Mario Scelba which was formed on 10 February 1954. Tremelloni and Ezio Vigorelli were the social democrat members of the cabinet.

Then Tremelloni served as the minister of treasury for three times (from 21 February 1962 to 20 June 1963, from 4 December 1963 to 21 July 1964 and from 22 July 1964 to 22 February 1966) and minister of defense from 23 February 1966 to 23 June 1968. He was also a board member of the European Investment Bank when he was serving as minister of treasury. From 1963 to 1968 he served at the Italian Senate.

Tremelloni died of heart attack at a hospital in Bruneck on 8 September 1987.

References

External links
 
 

20th-century Italian businesspeople
20th-century  Italian economists
1900 births
1987 deaths
Finance ministers of Italy
Businesspeople  from Milan
Italian Democratic Socialist Party politicians
Italian Ministers of Defence
Italian Socialist Party politicians
Politicians from Milan
Academic staff of the Polytechnic University of Milan
Members of the Chamber of Deputies (Italy)
Members of the Senate of the Republic (Italy)
Academic staff of the University of Geneva
Italian newspaper founders
Senators of Legislature IV of Italy
Government ministers of Italy